The Justice Party  (JP) is a centre-left to left-wing political party in South Korea. It has been placed as liberal, progressive, and social democratic. It was founded on 21 October 2012 when it split from moderates of the Unified Progressive Party. The Justice Party now takes a more moderate stance than the United Progressive Party or the Democratic Labor Party in the past.

History

The Progressive Justice Party changed its name to the Justice Party at the 2nd party congress on 16 July 2013. At the 4th party congress on 22 November 2015, the party officially merged with the extra-parliamentary groups: Preparatory Committee for the People's Party (2015), Labor Politics Coalition (노동정치연대), Members of Labor Party, after motions to merge the party with the Justice Party failed.

After the merger, Na Gyung-che, Ex-leader of the Labor Party, and Kim Se-kyun, leader of Preparatory Committee for the People's Party, were elevated to co-leadership roles, while Sim Sang-jung remained as a standing party leader. Kim Se-kyun stepped down from the co-leadership role in September 2016.

In the legislative election held in April 2016, the party increased its seat total by one with the election of Roh Hoe-chan to the Seongsan constituency in the city of Changwon. The party polled 7.2% in the party list ballot, returning a total of six legislators to the National Assembly.

In the 2017 election, Sim Sang-jung ran as the party's nominee after winning the party primary. Sim was endorsed by Korean Confederation of Trade Unions (KCTU) and ran a campaign focused on labor and social issues. Sim received media attention for being the only candidate arguing in favor of marriage equality during the debate. Sim won 6.2% of the vote, making her the most successful left-wing presidential candidate since the democratization of the country in 1987.

In July 2017, with Sim's two-year leadership term coming to an end, the party elected sitting National Assembly member Lee Jeong-mi as the new leader over Park Won-suk by 56 to 44.

On 31 March 2018, the party confirmed its decision to form a parliamentary group with Party for Democracy and Peace, under the name of Members group of Peace and Justice. The parliamentary group will be officially registered on 2 April. The incumbent floor leader of the party, Roh Hoe-chan was chosen to head the parliamentary group in the National Assembly. Roh Hoe-chan's abrupt passing on 23 July 2018 resulted in the automatic dissolution of the parliamentary group. Roh's death was widely mourned, attracting thousands of mourners and tributes across the South Korean political spectrum. The party retained Roh's Changwon seat, beating Liberty Korea challenger in the by-election held on 13 April 2019.

In July 2019, the party elected Sim Sang-jung as the new leader. It is her second non-consecutive term as the party's leader.

Ahead of the Republic of Korea's 2022 South Korean presidential election, Rep. Shim Sang-jung was elected as a candidate and ran. As a result of the general election, he failed with 2.37% of the vote. After losing the 2022 South Korean local elections, the number of seats was significantly reduced, winning fewer seats than the Progressive Party.

A vote was cast in favor of the motion for the arrest of Representative Lee Jae-myung held at the National Assembly. Moderate groups within the party, represented by "New Progress" and others, criticized the party's vote for the arrest motion, saying it viewed the prosecution's repression as too weak.

Political position 
The Justice Party's political position is mainly referred to as centre-left. However In South Korea's conservative political structure, it is also called left-wing. In the South Korean political landscape, where the liberal Democratic Party and the conservative People Power Party compete, JP is perceived as very radical. Candidates from both parties evaluated Justice Party candidate Sim Sang-jung as a radical. Though some experts in South Korea have also evaluated the Justice Party as closer to the moderate than centre-left like social democratic parties in Europe. Also Some researchers have evaluated the JP as being centrist in German political standards.

The Justice Party officially advocates social democracy (사회민주주의) and liberalism (자유주의). The party symbol is derived from the first letter L of "Labor" (노동) and "Liberty" (자유). JP rejects social conservatism and takes a socially progressive stance on feminism and LGBT rights issues. JP has a prominent cultural liberal tendency, and is also considered a "social-liberal" party compared to DPK, which is relatively "conservative-liberal" than JP. Major JP politicians, including Jang Hye-young, criticize the Democratic Party of Korea, but have a fairly favorable view of the U.S. Democratic Party style of modern liberalism and Joe Biden.

JP values fiscal responsibility and advocates tax increases for the creation of a welfare state. JP also opposes basic income. However, they are active in the area of labor rights, where left-liberal populists in the DPK are not interested in them.

The Justice Party, like historical social-democratic to progressive parties or the liberal Uri Party in the past, advocates the abolition of the National Security Law.

Ideology

Economy
The party calls for structural change of the Korean economy through change to the current chaebol-dominated economic system, democratic control of capitalistic excess through the implementation of economic democracy, and public ownership of basic utilities. The party is pursuing an alternative form of economic system in which basic standards of living are provided for everyone, equally. Where public ownership or the market economy are inefficient, the party advocates a social economy, including cooperatives, and further increasing the power levels of the social economy to that traditionally held by the market. The party also calls for the protection and increase of labor rights, and they promote unionization in the workplace, in order to equalize the power balance between capitalists and workers. The party advocates for the creation of a welfare state, drastically increasing funding in the public sector, providing universal welfare services such as childcare, education, employment, housing, healthcare, and post-retirement life. The party will fund these programs through increased taxation based on redistributive fiscal policy.

Environment
The party calls for an end to unrestricted development, pursuing sustainable development and climate justice. It is also in favor of animal welfare. It argues in favor of developing renewable energy, with an aim of doing away with oil and coal altogether. The party is against nuclear energy as an alternative, and advocates closing down old nuclear power plants and ceasing further construction of the plants.

Social issues
The party is the most socially progressive mainstream party in Korea calling for the eradication of all forms of discrimination, advocating increased participation of the minorities in the political sphere. It further advocates pursuing gender equality in the workplace and preserving women's right to choose to have an abortion. The party stands strongly against any form of oppression based on one's sexuality or gender identity. It calls for legislation cracking down on  hate crimes to protect the human rights of minorities. It also acknowledges diverse family structures without any discrimination. The party also fields LGBT candidates in elections and its members have been the only politicians to be completely open in their support of LGBT rights such as same-sex marriage.

JP most actively supports multiculturalism and anti-racism among major political parties in South Korea. JP criticizes China and Japan's hegemonic moves, but opposes hate speech against Chinese people and Japanese people. The progressive Sim Sang-jung saying, "I will not use anti-American, anti-Chinese and anti-Japanese sentiment in politics" in the 2022 South Korean presidential election.

Foreign relations 
In the midst of the conflict between the United States and China for regional hegemony and Japanese attempts at rearmament, the party believes peace in the Korean peninsula is a paramount issue. The party rejects any form of hegemony from both sides and refuses to take a side on the issue.

However, JP is much more critical of China than the United States. Representatively, there is an online dialogue with Ryu Ho-jeong and Joshua Wong in 2019, and in the same year, JP officially supported the Hong Kong democracy movement in 2019 at the party level. At the time, the main opposition LKP and the ruling DPK did not reveal the party's position in Hong Kong's pro-democracy movement, fearing excessive friction with China.

On the other hand, unlike JP's strong criticism of China, the level of criticism of the United States is weak and rather friendly. According to 2023 statistics, Justice Party supporters are more friendly to strengthening their alliance with the United States than Democratic Party of Korea supporters.

The reason why JP officially supports neutrality in the U.S.-China conflict is more related to anti-Japanese sentiment within the South Korean liberal camp than to sentiment toward the United States. JP opposes the "U.S.-led United States, Japan, and South Korea Triangle Alliance" (한미일 삼각 동맹). JP is also absolutely opposed to the entry of Japan's Self-Defense Forces into the Korean peninsula when a war breaks out on the Korean Peninsula.

Jang Hye-young, the party's main politician, is actively expressing her pro-American diplomatic and cultural views. She also participated in a project funded by the National Democratic Institute in the United States.

JP criticizes the ultra-nationalist project led by the Japanese conservative government, but, unlike DPK, opposes excessive use of anti-Japanese sentiment in economics and diplomacy, leaving much more room for improving relations with Japan than DPK. JP opposed DPK's anti-Japan diplomacy and PPP's anti-communist (anti-Nouth Korea) diplomacy.

North Korea 
The Justice Party insists that diplomacy with North Korea should be approached with the values of universal human rights rather than an unconditional appeasement approach.

On 28 September 2020, Justice Party leader Sim Sang-jung expressed a critical view of the Democratic Party's conciliatory policy toward North Korea based on Korean nationalism, saying, "Some of the ruling party prioritize inter-Korean relations over the lives of our people, and this must be corrected." This critical view of North Korea, in particular, has deepened since 2020 due to conflicts with the ruling Democratic Party.

Party factions 
According to the Hankyoreh, there are four major divisions within the Justice Party. Opinion groups are broadly divided into four groups. ‘Incheon Union’, ‘Together Seoul’, ‘New Progress’, ‘Transformation’.

Non-DPK/social-democratic "liberals" such as Sim Sang-jung, Jang Hye-young and Ryu Ho-jeong form the mainstream of the party, and their individual opinion group character is not clear. These are alternative liberals, but they are quite critical of another liberal Democratic Party of Korea (DPK). In the past, Roh Hoe-chan was also a liberal belonging to the mainstream of the Justice Party before he died of suicide in 2018.

The mainstream of the party is socio-cultural liberal/progressive tendencies, suggesting a differentiated identity from the DPK, but at the same time supporting moderate economic policies. Some labor activists in the party criticize the party's mainstream for "labor centrality missing" (노동중심성 실종). In response, the mainstream of the party expresses the view that the socio-cultural liberal/progressive value is not contrary to labor politics.

Transform

"Transition" (전환) is a left-wing opinion group within the Justice Party. Conversion was formed in 2021, and it is the largest leftist organization in the party created through the dissolution of the party's 'Forward', 'Labour Political Solidarity', 'Equality Social Network', 'Spontaneous Leftist Youth Group' and 'Momentum'. It support progressivism and democratic socialism. Members include Yang Gyeong-gyu, former first vice-representative of the Democratic Labor Party, and Kim Yun-gi, former vice-representative of the Justice Party.

Inaugural Remarks at the “Transformation” Launch Ceremony on August 21, 2022

Transform emphasized solidarity with other left-wing parties such as the Progressive Party and the Green Party, saying that “homework is solidarity with the progressive left” about the general election.

Participatory → New progress

The participatory group (참여계) is a pro-DPK "liberals" of the Justice Party. It is called the Participation Party because it is a faction in which members of the Participation Party party become the mainstream. As a moderate member of the party, it shows a pro-Roh Moo-hyun tendency.

Most of these participants belong to an opinion group called 'New Progress'. (새로운 진보) This faction evaluated that the decline in the Justice Party's support was due to the ambivalence criticizing both the Democratic Party and the People Power Party,And he pointed out that the Justice Party represented too much of feminism interests instead of 'workers and citizens'. They also called for the resignation of proportional representation members and the retirement of Sim Sang-jung from politics.They also demanded the abolition of youth and female quotas to fully reflect the will of party members.

After the local elections, New Progress said in a statement on June 7, 2022.

The New Progressive Party voted in favor of the motion to arrest Lee Jae-myung, saying that the party seems to be taking a position closer to the People Power Party rather than the Democratic Party of Korea. criticized it. Although belonging to this faction, there are many people who have left the Justice Party due to dissatisfaction with the Justice Party's line.

'New Progress' said the following in a statement related to the chaepo(arrest) motion.

Incheon Union

The 'Incheon Union'(인천연합) is mentioned as the largest faction within the party. Former party leader Lee Jeong-mi and National Assembly member Bae Jin-gyo are representative figures. These are economically and culturally liberal/progressives, but diplomatically support anti-imperialism and nationalism.

Leadership

Leaders
Roh Hoe-chan, Jo Jun-ho (co-serving; 21 October 2012 – 21 July 2013)
Cheon Ho-sun (21 July 2013 – 18 July 2015)
Sim Sang-jung (18 July 2015 – 11 July 2017)
Kim Se-kyun (co-serving; 22 November 2015 – 30 September 2016)
Na Gyung-che (co-serving; 22 November 2015 – 11 July 2017)
Lee Jeong-mi (11 July 2017 – 13 July 2019)
Sim Sang-jung (13 July 2019 – 12 October 2020)
Kim Jong-cheol (12 October 2020 – 25 January 2021)
Kim Yun-ki (25 January 2021 - 29 January 2021) (Interim)
Kang Eun-mi (29 January 2021 - 23 March 2021) (Interim)
Yeo Yeong-gug (23 March 2021 – 2 June 2022)
Lee Eun-ju (2 June 2022 - 28 October 2022)
Lee Jeong-mi (28 October 2022 – present)

Floor leaders
Kang Dong-won (21 October 2012 – 2 May 2013)
Sim Sang-jung (13 July 2013 – 9 June 2015)
Jeong Jin-hoo (9 June 2015 – 29 May 2016)
Roh Hoe-chan (30 May 2016 – 23 July 2018)
Yoon So-ha (23 July 2018 – 29 May 2020)
Bae Jin-gyo (30 May 2020 – 1 September 2020)
Kang Eun-mi (9 September 2020 – present)

Election results

President

Legislature

Local

See also

 Cultural liberalism
 Anti-racism
 Politics of South Korea
 Progressivism in South Korea
 Liberalism in South Korea
 Feminism in South Korea (factions)
 New Progressive Party (South Korea)
 Labor Party (South Korea)
 Progressive Party (South Korea, 2017)
 Gangnam liberal (faction)
 Uri Party
 Jasmine Bacurnay Lee

Notes

References

External links
 

 
Abortion-rights organizations
Anti-racist organizations in Asia
Centre-left parties in Asia
Immigration political advocacy groups in South Korea
Left-wing nationalism in South Korea
Left-wing parties in Asia
LGBT political advocacy groups in South Korea
Liberal parties in South Korea
Progressive parties in South Korea
Social democratic parties in Asia
Social liberal parties
Welfare in South Korea
2012 establishments in South Korea
Political parties established in 2012